Charles Francis Goggin (born July 7, 1945) is a former utility player in Major League Baseball who played with three teams from  to  and is the most decorated Vietnam War veteran to play Major League Baseball.  He played for the Pittsburgh Pirates (1972–73), Atlanta Braves (1973) and Boston Red Sox (1974). 

A pinch hitter and versatile player with a good throwing arm, Goggin made 35 appearances in all, mostly at second base, at 22 games. He also played 5 games each in left field and shortstop, two games as a backup catcher and a game in right field.

In his three-season career, Goggin was a .293 hitter (29-for-99) with seven RBI in 72 games (37 in pinch-hitting duties), including 19 runs, five doubles, and a .355 on-base percentage.

Following his playing career, Goggin managed the Nashville Sounds of the Southern League (1978) and also won a Mexican Pacific League championship with the 1978-79 Navojoa Mayos, a team that included future big leaguers Rickey Henderson and Randy Niemann on their roster.

Personal
Goggin is a Vietnam War veteran who served in the U.S. Marine Corps as an infantryman in 1966 and 1967. He was awarded the Bronze Star and the Purple Heart and served under Marine Col John Ripley. Following his career in baseball, Goggin resided in Nashville, Tennessee, and served as U.S. Marshal for the Middle District of Tennessee.

References

External links

1978-79 Mayos de Navojoa (Spanish)

1945 births
Living people
Atlanta Braves players
Boston Red Sox players
Pittsburgh Pirates players
Major League Baseball infielders
Major League Baseball outfielders
Major League Baseball catchers
Caribbean Series managers
United States Marine Corps personnel of the Vietnam War
Baseball players from Florida
People from Pompano Beach, Florida
Mayos de Navojoa players
Nashville Sounds managers
Salisbury Dodgers players
St. Petersburg Saints players
Santa Barbara Dodgers players
Arizona Instructional League Dodgers players
Albuquerque Dodgers players
Spokane Indians players
Florida Instructional League Pirates players
Columbus Jets players
Charleston Charlies players
Pawtucket Red Sox players
United States Marines
American expatriate baseball players in Mexico
Sportspeople from Broward County, Florida